Juan Caviglia (born 16 June 1997) is an Argentine professional footballer who plays as a midfielder for Estudiantes San Luis.

Career
Caviglia's career got underway in the senior ranks of Sarmiento, who signed him from Mariano Moreno de Junín in 2014. After being an unused substitute for a Primera B Nacional loss away to Brown on 3 March 2018, Caviglia went on to make five more appearances in the 2017–18 season which included his senior bow against Independiente Rivadavia on 18 March.

After a loan spell at Ferro Pico in 2021, Caviglia left Sarmiento and joined Estudiantes San Luis in February 2022.

Career statistics
.

References

External links

1997 births
Living people
People from Junín, Buenos Aires
Argentine footballers
Association football midfielders
Primera Nacional players
Club Atlético Sarmiento footballers
Club Sportivo Estudiantes players
Sportspeople from Buenos Aires Province